Gerardus Philippus "Gerrit" Brokx (22 June 1933 – 11 January 2002) was a Dutch politician of the Christian Democratic Appeal (CDA).

Decorations

References

External links

Official
  Mr. G.Ph. (Gerrit) Brokx Parlement & Politiek

1933 births
2002 deaths
Aldermen in North Brabant
Catholic People's Party politicians
Commanders of the Order of Orange-Nassau
Christian Democratic Appeal politicians
Dutch corporate directors
Dutch nonprofit directors
Dutch jurists
Dutch sports executives and administrators
Dutch Roman Catholics
Knights of the Order of the Netherlands Lion
Mayors in North Brabant
Members of the House of Representatives (Netherlands)
Members of the Provincial Council of North Brabant
Members of the Provincial-Executive of North Brabant
Municipal councillors in North Brabant
People from Oosterhout
People from Tilburg
State Secretaries for Housing and Spatial Planning of the Netherlands
Utrecht University alumni
20th-century Dutch politicians